Perkins Lake is an alpine lake in Blaine County, Idaho, United States, located in the Sawtooth Valley in the Sawtooth National Recreation Area. Perkins Lake can be accessed from State Highway 75 via Sawtooth National Forest road 205.

In the southern section of the Sawtooth Valley, Perkins Lake has easy access around its northern shore, several campgrounds, and private camps.  Camp Perkins, a Lutheran Outdoor Ministries camp is located on the northeast shore of Perkins Lake.

See also
 Alturas Lake
 List of lakes of the Sawtooth Mountains (Idaho)
 Sawtooth National Forest
 Sawtooth National Recreation Area
 Sawtooth Range (Idaho)

References

Lakes of Idaho
Lakes of Blaine County, Idaho
Glacial lakes of the United States
Glacial lakes of the Sawtooth National Forest